Pan American Day is a holiday observed by several countries in North and South America. It commemorates the First International Conference of American States which concluded on April 14, 1890, creating the International Union of American Republics, the forerunner to the Organization of American States (OAS). The holiday was originally proposed by the organization in 1930, and was first observed on April 14, 1930.

Parades are held, some schools put on plays, the orchestra plays music, people set up exhibits, and pageants are sometimes held.

Belize
In Belize, Pan American Day refers to October 12, which is celebrated as Columbus Day in the United States. It should not be confused with "Pan American Day," which celebrates the founding of the Organization of American States (OAS) on April 14.

Originally known as Columbus Day, Pan-American Day in Belize is a celebration of the migrations of the Mestizos and indigenous cultural groups from the Yucatan into Belize, creating the country we know today
Belize chooses not to celebrate the achievements of Columbus, but rather the forging of its rich cultural diversity. The Mestizos and Yucatec Maya came to Belize looking for a calm and peaceful land, free from conflict where they could settle.

Honduras

Though the Organization of American States (OAS) includes 35 countries, Honduras is the only country who observes a public holiday to mark the events of 1890. It is celebrated on April 14.

United States

In the United States, Pan American Day is observed by Presidential proclamation on April 14. In addition, the entire week on which the holiday falls is observed as Pan American Week. On April 7, 2017, President Donald Trump proclaimed Pan American Day and Pan American Week''''' on April 7, 2017.

References

Americas
International organization days
April observances
Observances in the United States by presidential proclamation
October observances